Andriy Mikhailovich Bandera (December 11, 1882, Stryi - July 10, 1941, Kyiv) was a  
chaplain, politician and member of the Ukrainian National Rada of the Western Ukrainian People's Republic, veteran of the Polish-Ukrainian war, member of the Shevchenko Scientific Society, a priest of the Ukrainian Greek Catholic Church, and father of Stepan Bandera.

He was repressed by members of the Bolshevist regime.

Biography
Andriy was born in 1882 in the town of Stryi in the Lviv region in the family of Michael and Euphrosyne.

In 1898, Andriy Bandera graduated with honors from the 4th grade of the Imperial-Royal Stryj Gymnasium, and in 1899 from the 5th grade with the first degree. According to the report of the management of this institution, in 1902 he graduated from VIII grade, passed the final exams, and received a certificate of maturity  (in electronic versions of articles about Priest Andriy Bandera in "Encyclopedia of Ukrainian History" and "Encyclopedia of Modern Ukraine" is mentioned that graduation took place in 1905). Andriy Bandera graduated from the Faculty of Theology in Lviv University in 1906. In the same year, in November, he married the priest's daughter Myroslava Glodzinska and was ordained.

He had an active political position during his studies at the gymnasium and joined the Ukrainian National Democratic Party. During the elections Andriy was engaged in political explanatory work among the peasants, and was a member of the Shevchenko Scientific Society since 1910.

The house of Andriy Bandera was frequently visited by active participants in the Ukrainian national life of Galicia (Eastern Europe), in particular: Pavlo Glodzinsky - one of the founders of the "Butter Union" and "Farmer" (Ukrainian economic institutions), Yaroslav Vesolovsky - Ambassador of the Vienna Parliament, sculptor Mykhailo Havrylko and others.

In October-November 1918 Andriy Bandera was one of the organizers of the Ukrainian government in Kaluski County. He formed military units from the peasants of the surrounding villages, armed with weapons hidden in 1917.

In 1919, Andriy was a delegate of the Ukrainian National Council of the West Ukrainian People's Republic in Stanislaviv from Kaluski County, and voted for the Act of Unification. During the Polish-Ukrainian War, he voluntarily joined the Ukrainian Galician Army, where in 1919–1920 he served as chaplain of the 9th Regiment.

From May 28 to June 8, 1919, he lived with his family in Buchach ), and later moved to the village of Yahilnytsia (now Chortkiv district, Ternopil region. In the summer of 1920 he returned to Galicia to hide from Polish officials who were persecuting Ukrainian politicians.

In 1920–1930 Andriy was a parish priest in Uhrynów Stary (today Staryi Uhryniv), and in 1930–1936 he was a pastor in the village of Volya-Zaderevatsk, and later, in 1936–1941 the pastor of the village of Trostyanets of Dolyna district.

On the night of May 22-23, or May 23, 1941, he was arrested as "the father of the head of the Krakow Organization of Ukrainian Nationalists center, Stepan Bandera." , and spent five days in Stanislav and a month and 13 days in Kyiv prisons.

On July 2, 1941, the investigation into the case of Andriy Bandera was completed. The indictment drawn up by investigators referred to the concealment of an illegal immigrant, the storage of nationalist literature, and upholding of the nationalist beliefs. However, the first, and therefore the main, accusation was that he was "the father of Stepan Bandera, the head of the foreign leadership of the anti-Soviet nationalist organization Organization of Ukrainian Nationalists, maintained a systematic relationship with him until recently." On July 7, a "trial" took place that lasted less than two hours. Answering the judges' questions about his children, Andriy Bandera proudly replied: “I gave my children a proper upbringing, instilling in them a love for Ukraine. The worldviews of my sons and daughters are the same."

After numerous tortures, he was sentenced to death on July 8 and shot three days later. Before his death he wrote "My personal confessions" (criminal case № 61112) - a confession about himself, his family and socio-political life in Western Ukraine in the '40s of XX century. The case does not contain any information about the place of his burial. Supposedly he found his last resting place in Bykivnia, after he was executed by NKVD.

See also
West Ukrainian People's Republic
Ukrainian War of Independence
Ukrainian Greek Catholic Church

References

https://www.pbc.rzeszow.pl/dlibra/publication/5295/edition/4877/content?ref=desc

Literature
 Дем'ян Г. Бандера Андрій Михайлович // Енциклопедія сучасної України : у 30 т. / ред. кол. : І. М. Дзюба [та ін.] ; НАН України, НТШ, Коорд. бюро Енцикл. Сучас. України НАН України. — Київ : Поліграфкнига, 2003. — Т. 2 : Б — Біо. — С. 189–190. — .
 Мельничук Б. Бандера Андрій Михайлович // Тернопільський енциклопедичний словник : у 4 т. / редкол.: Г. Яворський та ін. — Тернопіль : Видавничо-поліграфічний комбінат «Збруч», 2004. — Т. 1 : А — Й. — С. 73. — .
 Науменко К. Бандера Андрій // Енциклопедія історії України : у 10 т. / редкол.: В. А. Смолій (голова) та ін. ; Інститут історії України НАН України. — Київ : Наукова думка, 2003. — Т. 1 : А — В. — С. 177. — 688 с. : іл. — .

1882 births
1941 deaths
Members of the Shevchenko Scientific Society
Members of the Ukrainian Greek Catholic Church